Blokur is a music rights and data platform based in London which provides music reporting and licensing for digital products and services. The company is an official partner of the MLC (Mechanical Licensing Collective).

Overview 
Blokur was founded in 2017 by Phil Barry, a former recording artist who was inspired to build a platform that would help address the issue of recording artists not being paid effectively. The platform uses data engineering and sub-graph matching technology to link song recordings with their underlying compositions to tackle issues with misrepresentations of song data.

Blokur released a 2020 Songwriter Review, a report which calculates the best-performing global songwriter based on their shares in the top streamed songs. Tones and I topped the chart due to being the sole writer on her hit song Dance Monkey.The second instalment of the report, the 2021 Songwriter Review, was sponsored by The Ivor's Academy. That year, Olivia Rodrigo was announced as the top songwriter following the commercial success of her album Sour.

Company 
Blokur has partnerships with audio delivery companies 7digital and Tuned Global. The company’s funders include Innovate UK and Ascension.

References 

Music publishing
Music licensing organizations
Music databases
Music organisations based in the United Kingdom